Nesomyrmex is a genus of ants in the subfamily Myrmicinae. The genus is distributed in the Neotropical, Afrotropical and Malagasy regions. Most species live in arid climates, but some are known from the rainforest. They nest in soil or in trees. Little is known about their biology.

Species

Nesomyrmex anduzei (Weber, 1943)
Nesomyrmex angulatus (Mayr, 1862)
Nesomyrmex antoinetteae Mbanyana & Robertson, 2008
Nesomyrmex antoniensis (Forel, 1912)
Nesomyrmex argentinus (Santschi, 1922)
Nesomyrmex asper (Mayr, 1887)
Nesomyrmex bidentatus Csösz & Fisher, 2016
Nesomyrmex brasiliensis (Kempf, 1958)
Nesomyrmex braunsi (Forel, 1912)
Nesomyrmex brevicornis Csösz & Fisher, 2016
Nesomyrmex brimodus (Bolton, 1995)
Nesomyrmex brunneus Csösz & Fisher, 2016
Nesomyrmex capricornis Csösz & Fisher, 2015
†Nesomyrmex caritatis (De Andrade, Baroni Urbani, Brandão & Wagensberg, 1999)
Nesomyrmex cataulacoides (Snelling, 1992)
Nesomyrmex cederbergensis Mbanyana & Robertson, 2008
Nesomyrmex cingulatus Csösz & Fisher, 2016
Nesomyrmex clavipilis Wheeler, 1910
Nesomyrmex clypeatus Csösz & Fisher, 2016
Nesomyrmex costatus (Emery, 1896)
Nesomyrmex denticulatus (Mayr, 1901)
Nesomyrmex devius Csösz & Fisher, 2016
†Nesomyrmex dominicanus (De Andrade, Baroni Urbani, Brandão & Wagensberg, 1999)
Nesomyrmex echinatinodis (Forel, 1886)
Nesomyrmex edentatus Csösz & Fisher, 2016
Nesomyrmex entabeni Mbanyana & Robertson, 2008
Nesomyrmex evelynae (Forel, 1916)
Nesomyrmex excelsior Csösz & Fisher, 2016
Nesomyrmex exiguus Csösz & Fisher, 2016
Nesomyrmex ezantsi Mbanyana & Robertson, 2008
Nesomyrmex flavigaster Csösz & Fisher, 2016
Nesomyrmex flavus Csösz & Fisher, 2016
Nesomyrmex fragilis Csösz & Fisher, 2016
Nesomyrmex gibber (Donisthorpe, 1946)
Nesomyrmex gracilis Csösz & Fisher, 2016
Nesomyrmex grisoni (Forel, 1916)
Nesomyrmex hafahafa Csösz & Fisher, 2015
Nesomyrmex hirtellus Csösz & Fisher, 2016
Nesomyrmex humerosus (Emery, 1896)
Nesomyrmex inhaca Hita Garcia, Mbanyana, Audisio & Alpert, 2017
Nesomyrmex innocens (Forel, 1913)
Nesomyrmex inye Mbanyana & Robertson, 2008
Nesomyrmex itinerans (Kempf, 1959)
Nesomyrmex karooensis Mbanyana & Robertson, 2008
Nesomyrmex koebergensis Mbanyana & Robertson, 2008
Nesomyrmex larsenae Mbanyana & Robertson, 2008
Nesomyrmex longiceps Csösz & Fisher, 2016
Nesomyrmex madecassus (Forel, 1892)
Nesomyrmex mcgregori Mbanyana & Robertson, 2008
Nesomyrmex medusus Csösz & Fisher, 2015
Nesomyrmex minutus Csösz & Fisher, 2016
Nesomyrmex mirassolis (Diniz, 1975)
Nesomyrmex modestus Csösz & Fisher, 2016
Nesomyrmex nanniae Mbanyana & Robertson, 2008
Nesomyrmex nitidus Csösz & Fisher, 2016
Nesomyrmex njengelanga Mbanyana & Robertson, 2008
Nesomyrmex pittieri (Forel, 1899)
Nesomyrmex pleuriticus (Kempf, 1959)
Nesomyrmex punctaticeps Csösz & Fisher, 2016
Nesomyrmex pulcher (Emery, 1917)
Nesomyrmex reticulatus Csösz & Fisher, 2016
Nesomyrmex retusispinosus (Forel, 1892)
Nesomyrmex ruani Mbanyana & Robertson, 2008
Nesomyrmex rugosus Csösz & Fisher, 2016
Nesomyrmex rutilans (Kempf, 1958)
Nesomyrmex saasveldensis Mbanyana & Robertson, 2008
Nesomyrmex schwebeli (Forel, 1913)
Nesomyrmex sculptiventris (Mayr, 1887)
Nesomyrmex sellaris Csösz & Fisher, 2016
Nesomyrmex sikorai (Emery, 1896)
Nesomyrmex simoni (Emery, 1895)
Nesomyrmex spininodis (Mayr, 1887)
Nesomyrmex spinosus Csösz & Fisher, 2015
Nesomyrmex stramineus (Arnold, 1948)
Nesomyrmex striatus Csösz & Fisher, 2016
Nesomyrmex tamatavensis Csösz & Fisher, 2016
Nesomyrmex tonsuratus (Kempf, 1959)
Nesomyrmex tshiguvhoae Mbanyana & Robertson, 2008
Nesomyrmex vannoorti Mbanyana & Robertson, 2008
Nesomyrmex vargasi Longino, 2006
Nesomyrmex vicinus (Mayr, 1887)
Nesomyrmex wilda (Smith, 1943)
Nesomyrmex zaheri Sharaf, Akbar & Hita Garcia 2017

References

External links

Myrmicinae
Ant genera